Beldanga is a municipality town under the Barhampur subdivision of Murshidabad district in the state of West Bengal, India. Beldanga is an important trade centre of this district.

Geography

Location
It has an average elevation of 20 metres (65 feet).

Area overview
The area shown in the map alongside, covering Berhampore and Kandi subdivisions, is spread across both the natural physiographic regions of the district, Rarh and Bagri. The headquarters of Murshidabad district, Berhampore, is in this area. The entire area is overwhelmingly rural with over 80% of the population living in the rural areas.

Note: The map alongside presents some of the notable locations in the subdivisions. All places marked in the map are linked in the larger full screen map.

Demographics
According to the 2011 Census of India, Beldanga had a total population of 29,205, of which 14,694 (50%) were males and 14,511 (50%) were females. Population in the age range 0–6 years was 3,583. The total number of literate persons in Beldanga was 21,169 (82.62% of the population over 6 years).

As per 2001 Census of India, Beldanga had a population of 25,361. Males constitute 52% of the population and females 48%. Beldanga has an average literacy rate of 67%, higher than the national average of 59.5%; with 55% of the literates being male and 45% being female. 13% of the population is under 6 years of age.

Civic administration

Police station
Beldanga police station has jurisdiction over Beldanga municipal area and a part of Beldanga I CD Block.

Infrastructure
According to the District Census Handbook, Murshidabad,  2011, Beldanga covered an area of 3.98 km2. It had 50.73 km roads with open drains. The protected water-supply involved overhead tank etc. It had 3,713 domestic electric connections, 1,556 road lighting points. Among the medical facilities it had 2 hospitals (with 55 beds).

Transport 
Beldanga railway station is well connected with Kolkata via Sealdah-Lalgola Division Railway. National Highway 12 passes through the Barua More, Beldanga town.

Education

Colleges
 S.R. Fatepuria College
 Beldanga Humayun Kabir Memorial B.Ed college

High school
 Hareknagar AM Institution
 Mirzapur H.S.C High School
 Banipith girls high school
 Beldanga CRGS High School
 Kazisaha High Madrasha
 Harimati Girl's High School
 KUMARPUR B.N.M HIGH SCHOOL
 Beldanga Srish Chandra Vidyapith
 Sarat Pally Balika Vidyalay

Primary School
 Mederdhar Shishu Madrasah
 Mederdhar Primary School 
 Shrish Chandra Vidyapith
 Swami Pranabananda Vidyapith
 Beldanga Path bhawan

Healthcare
Beldanga Rotary Eye Hospital

See also
 Beldanga I (Community development block)
 Beldanga II (Community development block)

References

Cities and towns in Murshidabad district